Farah Abdelaziz (born 1 September 1992) is an Egyptian table tennis player. She competed in the women's team event at the 2020 Summer Olympics.

References

External links 
 

1992 births
Living people
Egyptian female table tennis players
Olympic table tennis players of Egypt
Table tennis players at the 2020 Summer Olympics